Edward David Onoja  (born August 1974) is a Nigerian politician who has served as the deputy governor of Kogi State since 2019. He hails from Odidoko-Emonyoku in Ogugu District of Olamaboro Local Government Area of Kogi State. He was the Chief of Staff to the Governor of Kogi State before assuming the office of the Deputy Governor of Kogi State on 21 October 2019.

Background 
Edward David Onoja was born in August 1974. He hails from Odidoko-Emonyoku in Ogugu District of Olamaboro Local Government Area of Kogi State.

He had his Primary School Education in Lagos State and later proceeded to Federal Government College, Kwali, Abuja for his Secondary School Education. In 1999, He graduated from the University of Jos with a Second (Upper Division) in Geology and Mining and invariably was one of the top graduating students in his class. He was active in student unionism and politics and eventually became the first elected President of his Faculty's Association: Natural Science Students Association (NASSA) in University of Jos between 1998 -1999.

Career 
He has an over 20 years work experience, spanning Banking, Oil and Gas and Politics.

Political Foray 
His first venture into politics was in 2011 where he was the candidate of the All Nigeria Peoples Party (ANPP) in the Olamaboro State Constituency in the 2011 General Election. In 2015, he became the Director General of the Kogi Youth Arise Group, chaired by Yahaya Bello, a Political Support Group that Championed the delivery of the victory of President Muhammadu Buhari in the 2015 General Election in Kogi State. Later that year, he became the Chief Strategist and Director General in the Yahaya Bello Gubernatorial Campaign. After the swearing of Governor Yahaya bello in January 2016. He became the Chief of Staff to the Governor until October 2019  when he was elevated to the Deputy Governor  after the impeachment of Simon Achuba. In the November 16, 2019 general election, he was elected as the Deputy Governor of Kogi State.

Onoja was also appointed the Director-General, APC Campaigns for the 2019 General Elections in Kogi State. He discharged that assignment with unprecedented results. The APC won 25 out of the 25 state constituency Assembly seats in Kogi State. The party also won seven out of the nine federal constituency seats in the state and two out of the three senate seats. Based on the recent ruling of the elections tribunals nullifying the only Senate seat lost by the APC, Onoja made a clean sweep of all three Senatorial seats in Kogi State.

References

1974 births
Living people
Nigerian bankers
Kogi State politicians
University of Jos alumni
All Progressives Congress politicians